Randall Anthony St. Claire (born August 23, 1960) is a former professional baseball pitcher and current coach. He played all or part of nine seasons in Major League Baseball for the Montreal Expos (1984–88), Cincinnati Reds (1988), Minnesota Twins (1989), Atlanta Braves (1991–92) and Toronto Blue Jays (1994) as a relief pitcher. He made one World Series appearance with the Braves in 1991, pitching the 9th inning of a Game 5 blowout win. He worked as pitching coach for the Montreal Expos/Washington Nationals and Miami Marlins before being hired by the Blue Jays organization.

St. Claire worked seven years as the pitching coach for the Montreal Expos, later the Washington Nationals. The team fired him on June 2, 2009. On October 27, 2009, the Miami Marlins hired him as their pitching coach.

He is the son of former major league catcher Ebba St. Claire. His brother Steve St. Claire had a four-year minor league baseball career.

Coaching
On January 13, 2014, St. Claire was named as the pitching coach for the Toronto Blue Jays Triple-A affiliate Buffalo Bisons.

See also
List of second-generation Major League Baseball players

References

External links

1960 births
Living people
American expatriate baseball players in Canada
Atlanta Braves players
Baseball coaches from New York (state)
Baseball players from New York (state)
Calgary Expos players
Calgary Cannons players
Cincinnati Reds players
Indianapolis Indians players
Jacksonville Suns players
Jamestown Expos players
Major League Baseball pitchers
Major League Baseball pitching coaches
Miami Marlins coaches
Minnesota Twins players
Montreal Expos coaches
Montreal Expos players
Nashville Sounds players
Oklahoma City 89ers players
Portland Beavers players
Richmond Braves players
San Jose Expos players
Sportspeople from Glens Falls, New York
Syracuse Chiefs players
Toronto Blue Jays players
Tucson Toros players
Washington Nationals coaches
West Palm Beach Expos players